Megeremaeidae is a family of oribatids in the order Oribatida. There is at least one genus, Megeremaeus, and about eight described species in Megeremaeidae.

References

Further reading

 
 
 
 

Acariformes
Acari families